Łążyn may refer to the following places:
Łążyn, Gmina Rojewo in Kuyavian-Pomeranian Voivodship (north-central Poland)
Łążyn, Gmina Obrowo in Kuyavian-Pomeranian Voivodeship (north-central Poland)
Łążyn, Gmina Zławieś Wielka in Kuyavian-Pomeranian Voivodeship (north-central Poland)
Łążyn, Warmian-Masurian Voivodeship (north Poland)